The Ethiopian thicket rat (Grammomys minnae) is a species of rodent in the family Muridae.
It is found only in Ethiopia. Its natural habitat is subtropical or tropical dry shrubland. It is threatened by habitat loss.

References

 Boitani, L., Lavrenchenko, L. & Dieterlen, F. 2004.  Grammomys minnae.   2006 IUCN Red List of Threatened Species.   Downloaded on 9 July 2007.

Endemic fauna of Ethiopia
Grammomys
Mammals of Ethiopia
Mammals described in 1984
Taxonomy articles created by Polbot